Benjamin Rush Floyd (December 10, 1811 – February 15, 1860) was an American lawyer and politician.

Floyd was born in Montgomery County, Virginia, His brother was John B. Floyd, Governor of Virginia. Floyd went to Georgetown University in Washington, D.C. and practiced law in Wytheville, Virginia. Floyd served in the Virginia House of Delegates in 1847 and 1848 and in the Virginia Senate in 1857 and 1858. Floyd served in the Virginia Constitutional Convention of 1850-1851. Floyd died suddenly from a heart attack in Washington, D. C. Floyd was packing at the time. He was to leave for Richmond, Virginia to go to the Democratic Party Convention.

Notes

External links

1811 births
1860 deaths
People from Montgomery County, Virginia
People from Wytheville, Virginia
Georgetown University alumni
Virginia lawyers
Democratic Party members of the Virginia House of Delegates
Democratic Party Virginia state senators
19th-century American politicians
19th-century American lawyers